Aksana Petrushenka also spelt as Oksana Petrushenka (born 25 September 1984) is a Belarusian deaf swimmer who is also a current world record holder among deaf swimmers in women's 100m and 200m breaststroke. She has represented Belarus at the Deaflympics in five occasions in 2001, 2005, 2009, 2013 and 2017. She is considered to be the second most decorated woman in Deaflympics history with a record haul of 28 medals, which is second highest among women in Deaflympics after Cindy-Lu Bailey.

Career 
She made her Deaflympic debut at the 2001 Summer Deaflympics and claimed her first Deaflympic medal in the same multi-sport event which was a bronze in the women's  freestyle relay. She claimed her first Deaflympic gold medal at the 2005 Summer Deaflympics in the women's 200m individual medley.

She was awarded the ICSD Deaf Sportswoman of the Year Award in 2009 by the International Committee of Sports for the Deaf for her medal success at the 2009 Summer Deaflympics where she bagged six medals including four gold medals. On 8 August 2011, she set a new world record as well as World Deaf Championship record in women's 200m breaststroke among deaf during the World Deaf Swimming Championships.

She also received the EDSO Sportswoman of the Year award in 2013 from the European Deaf Sports Organisation mainly for her performances at the 2013 Summer Deaflympics where she clinched seven medals including six gold medals.

On 11 August 2015, she broke her own deaf world record in women's 100m breaststroke during the 2015 World Deaf Swimming Championships. She also claimed three gold medals in the 2017 Summer Deaflympics.

References 

1984 births
Living people
Belarusian female breaststroke swimmers
Deaf swimmers
Belarusian deaf people
Belarusian female medley swimmers